Coin debasement is the act of decreasing the amount of precious metal in a coin, while continuing to circulate it at face value. This was frequently done by governments in order to inflate the amount of currency in circulation; typically, some of the precious metal was replaced by a cheaper metal when the coin was minted. But when done by an individual, precious metal was physically removed from the coin, which could then be passed on at the original face value, leaving the debaser with a profit. Coin debasement was effected by several methods, including clipping (shaving metal from the coin's circumference) and sweating (shaking the coins in a bag and collecting the dust worn off).

Until the mid-20th century, coins were often made of silver or (rarely) gold, which were quite soft and prone to wear. This meant coins naturally got lighter (and thus less valuable) as they aged, so coins that had lost a small amount of bullion would go unnoticed. Modern coins used as currency are made of hard, cheap metals such as steel, copper, or a copper-nickel alloy, reducing wear and making it difficult and unprofitable to debase them.

Coin clipping 

Clipping is the act of shaving off a small portion of a precious metal coin for profit. Over time, the precious metal clippings could be saved up and melted into bullion or used to make new coins.

Coin clipping was usually considered by the law to be of a similar magnitude to counterfeiting, and was occasionally punished by death, a fate which befell English counterfeiters Thomas Rogers and Anne Rogers in 1690. Even among pirates, clipping coins was considered a serious breach of trust. Henry Avery's pirate fleet attacked the treasure ship Gunsway in 1695 and netted one of the largest pirate captures in history. When fellow pirate William May's crew were found to have traded clipped coins to Avery's crew, Avery took back nearly all the treasure he had shared with May and his men and sent them away.

Coin clipping is why many coins have the rim of the coin marked with stripes (milling or reeding), text (engraving) or some other pattern that would be destroyed if the coin were clipped. This practice is attributed to Isaac Newton, who was appointed Master of the Mint of Great Britain in 1699. Although the metal used in most modern fiat coins has insignificant intrinsic value, modern milling can be a deterrent to counterfeiting, an aid to the blind to distinguish different denominations, or purely decorative.

Sweating 

In the process of sweating, coins were placed in a bag and shaken. The bits of metal that had worn off the coins were recovered from the bottom of the bag. Sweating tended to wear the coin in a more natural way than clipping, and so was harder to detect.

Plugging 
If the coin was large, a hole could be punched out of the middle, and the face of the coin hammered to close up the hole. Or the coin could be sawed in half, and a plug of metal extracted from the interior. After filling the hole with a cheaper metal, the two halves would be welded back together again. Verbal references to plugged quarters and plugged dimes eventually yielded the common phrase "not worth a plugged nickel" (or 'plug nickel', or even a plugged cent), emphasizing the worthlessness of such a tampered coin.

References

Further reading

External links
 

Coins
Commercial crimes